Paliga celatalis is a moth in the family Crambidae. It is found in Taiwan and probably in Sri Lanka.

References

Crambidae
Moths described in 1859